Splachnum, also known as dung moss or petticoat moss, is a genus of moss that is well known for its entomophily. It commonly grows on patches of dung or decomposing animal matter.

Etymology 
The name Splachnum comes from the Ancient Greek word splachnos, meaning guts or entrails. This refers to appearance of the top of the plant's dried sporophyte - it is often red and wrinkled.

Description 
This genus is known for its unique sporophyte structure. Sporophytes are brightly coloured and produce an odour similar to dung meant to attract insects. This sort of chemical mimicry of decomposing matter is unique in Splachnum and closely related genera.

Evolution and taxonomy 
Because Splachnum grows in such specific conditions, it is used as a model species for understanding the evolutionary mechanisms necessary for co-existing in patchy habitats.

Species 

 Splachnum sphaericum
 Splachnum rubrum
 Splachnum luteum
 Splachnum ampullaceum
 Splachnum adolphi-friederici
 Splachnum austriacum
 Splachnum melanocaulon
 Splachnum pennsylvanicum
 Splachnum resectum
 Splachnum vasculosum
 Splachnum weberbaueri

See also 
 Bryophyta
 Entomophily

References 

Moss genera
Splachnales